The Federal Interpleader Act of 1917   was United States federal legislation enacted by the 64th United States Congress approved February 22, 1917. In 1925 it was codified in the United States Code as 28 U.S.C. 41(26) (1925).

History 
The Act allowed an insurance company, or fraternal benefit society subject to multiple claims on the same policy to file a suit in equity by a bill of interpleader in United States district courts and providing nationwide service of process. It was introduced to overcome the ruling of the United States Supreme Court in New York Life v. Dunlevy , that for a party to be bound by an interpleader that party must be served process in a way that obtains personal jurisdiction. The policy must have a value of at least $500 is claimed or may be claimed by adverse claimants; which is less than the amount in controversy of $3,000 in Judicial Code §48(1) then required for general diversity jurisdiction. Two or more of the beneficiaries must live in different states.

This Act was amended in 1925 by  approved February  25, 1925 dividing it into three sections,  eliminating the words "may claim" that were in the 1917 act and clarifying the venue provisions . This element of civil procedure was subsequently in 1926 was repealed and replaced by,  approved May 8,1926, which added  to those who can bring suit casualty company and surety company, empowered the court to enjoin claimant from proceeding in any state or other federal court on the same liability, adding provisions as to the proper venue for the interpleader in  cases were the claimants are in different districts.

The Act

United States district courts have jurisdiction to hear suites in equity began by a bill of interpleader where:
brought by insurance company, or fraternal beneficiary society
duly verified
the bill shows one or more person residing within the jurisdiction of the court is a bona fide claimant against the company or society
the company or society made or issued an insurance policy or certificate of membership for the payment of at least $500
to beneficiaries, heirs, next of kin, or legal representative of the insured person or member
two or more adverse claimants, citizens of different states, are claiming or may claim entitlement to the insurance or benefits
the company or society deposits the amount of such insurance or benefits with the clerk of the court.

The court may issue process to any claimant to the United States marshal of any district the claimant may reside or be found.

References

1917 in American law
Equity (law)
United States federal judiciary legislation
United States civil procedure